Asterocampa idyja, the cream-banded emperor, is a species of butterfly in the family Nymphalidae.

Description
The upperside of the wings is brown in both sexes. The male forewing has white spots near the tip, and some yellow spots across the wing's center. The hindwing of the males has six dark eyespots that are submarginal. Females have much darker spots, which are more diffuse. Their forewing is not as hooked, and much broader than in males.

Ecology
Adults are on wing in October.

Distribution
The species can be found in Cuba, Guatemala, the Isle of Pines and Mexico. They rarely appear on Hispaniola and Puerto Rico.

Subspecies
 Asterocampa idyja idyja (Cuba, Haiti, Puerto Rico) - dusky emperor
 Asterocampa idyja argus (Bates, 1864) (Mexico, Guatemala, Honduras, Nicaragua, Belize) - banded emperor

References

Apaturinae
Butterflies of Central America
Butterflies of the Caribbean
Butterflies of Cuba
Butterflies of North America
Butterflies described in 1828